Allan Simonsen (5 July 1978 – 22 June 2013) was a Danish racing driver, born in Odense. He died after a crash during the third lap of the 2013 24 Hours of Le Mans.

Career

After beginning his career in karting racing against the likes of future Formula One World Champion Kimi Räikkönen, Simonsen moved to cars in 1999, winning the Danish Formula Ford Championship. He raced in Formula Palmer Audi in 2000, before moving to German Formula 3 and Formula Renault 2.0 UK in 2001.

Simonsen moved to sports car racing for 2002, driving a Ferrari 360 for Veloqx Motorsport in the British GT Championship. He began racing in Australia in 2003 for Mark Coffey Racing, driving a Ferrari 360 Challenge to 8th place in the 2003 Australian Nations Cup Championship for GT style cars and 2nd place in Group 2. He would then go on to finish in 8th place in the 2003 Bathurst 24 Hour driving a Lamborghini Diablo GTR. In the 2004 Australian Nations Cup Championship he drove the 360 to 3rd place in the Trophy Class while driving a Ferrari 550 GT2 in a limited campaign to 7th in the outright class.

While in Australia, Simonsen also drove in the Sandown 500 and Bathurst 1000 V8 Supercar events. Simonsen's best Bathurst result came in 2011, when he finished third for Kelly Racing driving alongside Greg Murphy in a Holden VE Commodore. Simonsen won the Australian GT Championship in 2007 (driving both a Ferrari 360 GT and a Ferrari F430) and finished second in 2008 driving a Ferrari F430 GT.

At the 2011 Sprint Bathurst event, he set a blistering time of 2.04.95 around the famous Mount Panorama circuit. This was a monumental effort at the time as it was a full 2 seconds clear of any V8 Supercar lap time and comparable to the Formula 3 lap record set in the following year. This time so amazed the officials that they initially removed it from the timing screens as they believed it to be in error. It wasn't until it was confirmed by the manual time keeper and the teams own data that the time was reinstated.

Simonsen placed fourth in the 2007 Le Mans Series season, in a partial season driving a Porsche 911 GT3 for Virgo Motorsport, which included a GT2 class win in the Nürburgring 1000. He drove Ferraris for Team Farnbacher in the Le Mans Series and various international series from 2008 through 2011. During that time, Simonson won the GT2 class at the 2009 1000 km of Okayama with Dominik Farnbacher and the SP7 class in the 2010 24 Hours Nürburgring with Farnbacher, Leh Keen, and Marco Seefried. He participated in the 24 Hours of Le Mans seven times between 2007 and 2013, finishing on the GT2 class podium twice: third in 2007 and second in 2010.

Death

In the 9th minute of the 2013 24 Hours of Le Mans, and on his third lap, Simonsen was leading the LMGTE Am field with his No. 95 Aston Martin Vantage GTE. At the Tertre Rouge corner, Simonsen's car twitched as he accelerated through the right hand turn, and when he attempted to correct, the car veered left before impacting the crash barriers on the outside of the corner. He was extricated from the car, reportedly conscious, before being taken to the on-site medical centre where he succumbed to his injuries. His death was the first in racing conditions during the 24 Hours of Le Mans since Jo Gartner died in a 1986 crash, while French driver Sébastien Enjolras died more recently in a pre-qualifying session accident in 1997.

Race officials raised a Danish flag at half mast over the circuit's podium during the race in honor of Simonsen. Fellow Danish driver Tom Kristensen won the race overall and dedicated his team's victory to the memory of Simonsen.

Memorials

The award for the fastest qualifier at the Bathurst 12 Hour, which Simonsen won in 2013, is named the Allan Simonsen Pole Position Trophy.

Career results

Career summary

24 Hours of Le Mans results

Bathurst 24 Hour results

Bathurst 12 Hour results

International V8 Supercars Championship

Complete Bathurst 1000 results

References

External links
 
 

1978 births
2013 deaths
24 Hours of Daytona drivers
24 Hours of Le Mans drivers
American Le Mans Series drivers
British Formula Renault 2.0 drivers
British GT Championship drivers
Danish racing drivers
European Le Mans Series drivers
FIA GT Championship drivers
FIA World Endurance Championship drivers
Formula Ford drivers
Formula Palmer Audi drivers
German Formula Three Championship drivers
Rolex Sports Car Series drivers
Sportspeople from Odense
Racing drivers who died while racing
Sport deaths in France
Supercars Championship drivers
ADAC GT Masters drivers
24 Hours of Spa drivers
Asian Le Mans Series drivers
Britcar 24-hour drivers
Aston Martin Racing drivers
Garry Rogers Motorsport drivers
Dick Johnson Racing drivers
Kelly Racing drivers
Van Amersfoort Racing drivers
Nürburgring 24 Hours drivers